George Holt (born 1840, year of death unknown) was a United States Navy sailor and a recipient of the United States military's highest decoration, the Medal of Honor.

Born in Louisville, Kentucky in 1840, Holt later joined the Navy from that state. On that day, while the Plymouth was at the Port of Hamburg, Germany, a small boat approached the ship in a strong current. When the boat capsized, Holt and another sailor, Landsman Paul Tobin, jumped overboard and rescued one of the boat's crewmen. For this action, both he and Tobin were awarded the Medal of Honor a year later, on October 10, 1872.

Holt's official Medal of Honor citation reads:
On board the U.S.S. Plymouth, Hamburg Harbor, 3 July 1871. Jumping overboard at the imminent risk of his life, Holt, with a comrade, rescued from drowning one of a party who was thrown from a shore boat into a 4-knot, running tide while the boat was coming alongside the ship.

See also
 List of Medal of Honor recipients during peacetime

References

External links
 
 

1840 births
Year of death missing
Military personnel from Louisville, Kentucky
United States Navy sailors
United States Navy Medal of Honor recipients
Non-combat recipients of the Medal of Honor